Larva migrans can refer to:

 Cutaneous larva migrans, a skin disease in humans, caused by the larvae of various nematode parasites
 Visceral larva migrans, a condition in children caused by the migratory larvae of nematodes
 Ocular larva migrans, an ocular form of the larva migrans syndrome that occurs when larvae invade the eye
 Larva migrans profundus, also known as Gnathostomiasis